Meteor-M No.1 was the first of the Russian Meteor-M series of polar-orbiting weather satellites. It was launched on a Soyuz-2.1b rocket with a Fregat upper stage on 17 September 2009. Meteor-M No.1 was the designated replacement for Meteor-3M No.1, and had a design life of 5 years. In November 2014, Russian officials announced the termination of the mission after a failure of the onboard attitude control system.

See also

 Meteor

References

Spacecraft launched in 2009
Weather satellites of Russia
Spacecraft launched by Soyuz-2 rockets